"Kiss on My List" is a song by the American duo Hall & Oates. It was written by Daryl Hall and Janna Allen, and produced by Hall and John Oates. It was the third single release from their ninth studio album, Voices (1980), and became their second US Billboard Hot 100 number-one single (after "Rich Girl" in 1977).  It spent three weeks at the top spot.

The music video was the 204th that aired on MTV's first day of broadcast. The 45 rpm version of the song appears on the compilation albums Rock 'n Soul Part 1 (1983) and Playlist: The Very Best of Daryl Hall & John Oates (2008).

Background
The song was written with the intention of Janna Allen, sister of Hall's longtime girlfriend Sara Allen, singing it, as she was interested in starting a music career. Hall cut a demo version as a guide for her, but later when his manager found the tape lying around the studio, he insisted that Hall and Oates cut the song themselves. In fact, the production team liked the demo so much that they did not do a second take, instead adding background vocals and instrumentation to the demo and mixing them together. Hall recalled that is why the drums sounded so "dinky" - the "drums" in fact being the early Roland CR-78 drum machine mixed in with a live drumming overdub.

Hall calls it an anti-love song, with the song title being tongue-in-cheek sarcasm in that the kiss is not that important, in that it is on a list of other things that are just as important.

In an interview with Mix magazine, Daryl Hall said: "Eddie Van Halen told me that he copied the synth part from 'Kiss On My List' and used it in 'Jump.' I don't have a problem with that at all."

Reception
Record World said it has "a bouncy op sound with heavenly harmonies."

Personnel
Daryl Hall – lead vocals, keyboards, synthesizers
John Oates – backing vocals, 6 and 12-string guitars, Roland CR-78 drum machine
John Siegler – bass guitar
Jerry Marotta – drums
Additional musicians
Jeff Southworth – lead guitar
Mike Klvana – equipment technician

Chart performance

Weekly charts

Year-end charts

See also
 List of Hot 100 number-one singles of 1981 (U.S.)

References

Songs about kissing
1979 songs
1981 singles
Hall & Oates songs
Billboard Hot 100 number-one singles
Cashbox number-one singles
Songs written by Daryl Hall
Songs written by Janna Allen
RCA Records singles